The shannon (symbol: Sh) is a unit of information named after Claude Shannon, the founder of information theory. It is understood as such within the realm of information theory, and is conceptually distinct from the bit, a term used in data processing and storage to denote a single instance of a binary signal. A sequence of n binary symbols (such as contained in computer memory or a binary data transmission) is properly described as consisting of n bits, but the information content of those n symbols may be more or less than n shannons according to the a priori probability of the actual sequence of symbols.

The shannon also serves as a unit of the information entropy of an event, which is defined as the expected value of the information content of the event (i.e., the probability-weighted average of all potential events).  Given a number of possible outcomes, unlike information content, the entropy has an upper bound, which occurs when the possible outcomes are equiprobable.  The maximum entropy of n bits is n Sh.  A further quantity that it is used for is channel capacity (usually per unit time), which is the maximum of the expected value of the information content that can be transferred with negligible probability of error encoded over a channel.

Nevertheless, the term bits of information or simply bits is more often heard, even in the fields of information and communication theory, rather than shannons; just saying bits can therefore be ambiguous. Using the unit shannon is an explicit reference to a quantity of information content, information entropy or channel capacity, and is not restricted to binary data, whereas "bits" can as well refer to the number of binary symbols involved, as is the term used in fields such as data processing.

Similar units

The shannon is connected through constants of proportionality to two other units of information:

The hartley, a seldom-used unit, is named after Ralph Hartley, an electronics engineer interested in the capacity of communications channels. Although of a more limited nature, his early work, preceding that of Shannon, makes him recognized also as a pioneer of information theory. The conversion factor quoted above is given by log10(2).

From a mathematical perspective, the nat is a more natural unit of information, but 1 nat does not correspond to a case in which all possibilities are equiprobable, unlike with the shannon and hartley. In each case, formulae for the quantification of information capacity or entropy involve taking the logarithm of an expression involving probabilities. If base-2 logarithms are employed, the result is expressed in shannons, if base-10 (common logarithms) then the result is in hartleys, and if natural logarithms (base e), the result is in nats.

Information measures

In information theory and derivative fields such as coding theory, one cannot quantify the "information" in a single message (sequence of symbols) out of context, but rather a reference is made to the model of a channel (such as bit error rate) or to the underlying statistics of an information source. There are thus various measures of or related to information all of which may use the shannon as a unit.

For instance, in the above example, a 16-bit channel could be said to have a channel capacity of 16 Sh, but when connected to a particular information source that only sends one of 8 possible messages, one would compute the entropy of its output as no more than 3 Sh. And if one already had been informed through a side channel that the message must be among one or the other set of 4 possible messages, then one could calculate the mutual information of the new message (having 8 possible states) as no more than 2 Sh. Although there are infinite possibilities for a real number chosen between 0 and 1, so-called differential entropy can be used to quantify the information content of an analog signal, such as related to the enhancement of signal-to-noise ratio or confidence of a hypothesis test. 

The shannon (or nat, or hartley) is thus a unit of information used for quite different quantities and in various contexts, always dependent on a stated model, rather than having a rather context-free and unambiguous significance such as the gram has as a unit of mass.

References

Units of information
unit